Ting Shan-hsi (29 May 1935 – 22 November 2009), also known by his pseudonym Erh Yang, was a Chinese filmmaker and screenwriter who directed over 50 films in Taiwan and Hong Kong, mainly in the 1970s and 1980s.

Filmography

Film

TV series

External links

1935 births
2009 deaths
Film directors from Shandong
Taiwanese screenwriters
Screenwriters from Shandong
Taiwanese film directors
Writers from Qingdao
National Taiwan University of Arts alumni
Taiwanese people from Shandong
Deaths from cancer in Taiwan
Deaths from liver cancer
20th-century screenwriters